Edgar Eddie Lacy (August 2, 1944 – March 22, 2011) was an American basketball player who won two NCAA championships at UCLA, then played one season in the American Basketball Association with the Los Angeles Stars.  In public printed media, his last name was generally rendered as Lacey. However, at the time he signed his professional contract, he indicated the correct spelling had always been Lacy.

Lacy was a highly decorated player at Jefferson High School in Los Angeles.  He was twice named a high school All-American by Parade Magazine and was Los Angeles city player of the year as a senior in 1963.  Lacy chose to attend hometown UCLA and play for future Hall of Fame coach John Wooden.  In his sophomore season, he was a starter on the Bruins' 1964–65 championship team.  After a strong junior season, Lacy redshirted what would have been his senior year with a broken leg in 1966–67 as the Bruins won their third championship.

In 1967–68, Lacy opted to return and was again a starter for the Bruins.  However, in a highly anticipated match-up between the Bruins and the Houston Cougars—a contest dubbed the "Game of the Century" by the media—Wooden benched Lacy after 11 minutes and he never re-entered the game. Upset with Wooden's public comments implying that he did not want back into the game, Lacy quit the team three days later, missing what would be another UCLA championship run. "I've never enjoyed playing for that man," Lacy said of Wooden after quitting. In 2008, Wooden stated, "I'm sorry I said that. It hurt him, and that's why he quit. I was very disappointed. Edgar was a fine boy."

Lacy was drafted by the San Francisco Warriors in the fourth round of the 1968 NBA draft (he had also been drafted by the Boston Celtics the previous year).  However, he instead played in the ABA for the Los Angeles Stars. Lacy played one season for the Stars, averaging 5.1 points and 3.9 rebounds in 46 games. Prior to the next season, he retired from professional basketball, stating his intention to return to college to pursue a law degree. Lacy ended up playing his entire basketball career—high school, college and pro—for teams based in Los Angeles.

Edgar Lacy lived in West Sacramento, California where he died on March 22, 2011.

References

External links
Press-Telegram News Obituary for Edgar Lacy

1944 births
2011 deaths
American men's basketball players
Basketball players from Los Angeles
Boston Celtics draft picks
Los Angeles Stars players
Parade High School All-Americans (boys' basketball)
People from West Sacramento, California
San Francisco Warriors draft picks
Small forwards
UCLA Bruins men's basketball players
Jefferson High School (Los Angeles) alumni